Andrea Rabino (born 23 March 1978) is a former Italian sprinter who won two medals at International senior level a participate at two edition of the World Indoor Championships and two of the European Athletics Indoor Championships when he was finalist in Vienna 2002.

Biography
He also won two national titles at senior level.

National records
 50 metres: 5.78 ( Liévin, 28 February 2004) - current holder

Achievements

National titles
 Italian Athletics Indoor Championships
 60 metres: 1999, 2003

See also
 List of Italian records in athletics
 Italian national track relay team
 Italy at the Military World Games

Notes

References

External links
 

1978 births
Living people
Athletics competitors of Centro Sportivo Carabinieri
Italian male sprinters
Universiade bronze medalists for Italy
Universiade medalists in athletics (track and field)
Medalists at the 2001 Summer Universiade
Sportspeople from Carpi, Emilia-Romagna